Janq'u Uta (Aymara janq'u white, uta house, "white house", also spelled Jankho Uta) is a  mountain in the Bolivian Andes. It is located in the La Paz Department, Aroma Province, Sica Sica Municipality. Janq'u Uta lies southwest of Chuqi Sillani.

References 

Mountains of La Paz Department (Bolivia)